Diltor Vladimir Araújo Opromolla (13 April 1934, São Paulo – 15 December 2004, Bauru) was a Brazilian physician and dermatologist respected due to his lifetime work with leprosy patients and leprosy research.  Opromolla performed all his work at Lauro de Souza Lima Institute in Bauru, São Paulo, a WHO reference hospital for dermatology.  He taught dermatology and leprosy to doctors, nurses, and other health workers.  Among other things, he was the first to introduce rifamycin in the treatment of leprosy, in 1963.

Opromolla battled gastric cancer for the whole year of 2004 and died on December 15, 2004.

References
 Fleury, RN. Diltor Vladimir Araújo Opromolla. Anais Brasileiros de Dermatologia, 80(4), July/Aug. 2005. Biography and obituary.
 Tribute Paid to Doctor Diltor Vladimir Araújo Opromolla, Symbol of the Fight against Hansen's Disease. Pan American Health Organization.
 Naafs B, Silva E, Vilani-Moreno F, Marcos EC, Nogueira ME, Opromolla DV. Factors influencing the development of leprosy: an overview. Int J Lepr Other Mycobact Dis. 2001 Mar;69(1):26-33. Review. 
 Limalde S, Opromolla DV. First results on the treatment of leprosy with rifamycin. Chemotherapy. 1963;10:668-78.

References

External links
 Search for Dr. Opromolla's international research papers. PubMed (US National Library of Medicine).
 Search for Dr. Opromolla's full text papers at the SciElo database.
 Instituto Lauro de Souza Lima. Home Page.

1934 births
2004 deaths
Deaths from stomach cancer
Brazilian leprologists
Brazilian people of Italian descent
Deaths from cancer in São Paulo (state)
Brazilian dermatologists